Bastiampillai Anthonipillai Thomas  or "Father Thomas" (7 March 1886 – 26 January 1964) was a Roman Catholic priest of the congregation of Missionary Oblates of Mary Immaculate and founder of the Rosarians Order.

Life 
Thomas was born on 7 March 1886 in Padiyanthalvu, Jaffna, Sri Lanka. He studied at St. Patrick's College, Jaffna and at  University of Cambridge. Since childhood he was of weak health.

Thomas was compelled to become a priest after hearing the words “If anyone wants to be a follower of mine, let him renounce himself, take up his cross and follow me” (Mt 16:24) at a Sacred Scripture lesson. He was ordained a priest on 6 January 1912. Bishop Alfred-Jean Guyomard, OMI, the Bishop of Jaffna, invited Thomas to establish contemplative monasteries on the island. He was well versed in Hindu literature and the Hindu classics.

Thomas died on 26 January 1964 and was declared a Servant of God on 11 March 2006 by Pope Benedict XVI.

References 

1886 births
1964 deaths
Alumni of St. Patrick's College, Jaffna
People from Northern Province, Sri Lanka
People from British Ceylon
Servants of God
Sri Lankan Tamil priests
20th-century Sri Lankan Roman Catholic priests
Venerated Catholics
Missionary Oblates of Mary Immaculate